Jiří Weiss (29 March 1913 – 9 April 2004) was a Czech film director, screenwriter, writer, playwright and pedagogue.

Life

Early life
Jiří Weiss was born to a wealthy Jewish family in Prague. He was named after Czech king Jiří z Poděbrad. His parents were Emil Weiss (1880–1942) and Martha Weissová (née Fuchsová; 1882–1944). Emil was a liqueur factory owner. Since his youth, Jiří was an ardent communist, which was the source of conflicts with his capitalist parents. He was friends with Franz Kafka's niece Marianne Pollaková and was able read books of then-unknown Kafka in the 1920s. Weiss was interested in studying at film schoolweis, but his parents preferred him to be an attorney. While still in his teens, he left his home and lived with his friend . Weiss worked as a copywriter in advertising. His father, who disagreed with his life choices, had him institutionalized in a mental hospital and Weiss never spoke to him again. In his early twenties, he started working as a copywriter for Metro-Goldwyn-Mayer in Prague. At this time, he wrote his first book – a story for children O věrné Hadimršce. He befriended leading intellectuals of the Left Front in Prague, including Vladislav Vančura and Ivan Olbracht. In 1934, Vančura invited him to be an assistant cinematographer on his movie Marijka the Faithless, based on Olbracht's book.

Filmmaking
Weiss was still determined to become a film director. Lehovec introduced Weiss to Alexandr Hackenschmied, who helped him edit the film at the Baťa film studios in Zlín. Weiss then sent the film to Venice Film Festival where it placed 5th best among 72 amateur movies in 1935. He was approached by Eastman Kodak Company and agreed to exchange the finished film for 900 metres of 35mm film stock. Once again, he borrowed a camera and made a new film with the same theme and the same actors called People in the Sun. He edited the film during nights using the equipment in MGM offices. The film was screened at Kotva cinema in Prague as part of the avant–garde program together with The Blood of a Poet or Un Chien Andalou. Weiss was praised by local critics and was awarded the 10,000 Kčs from the Film department of Ministry of Commerce. In 1936, he was hired at A-B studio in Prague and as the first assignment he made his first professional film Sun Is Shining over Lužnice. Later that year, he directed a short documentary about aviation Give us the Wings. He then apprenticed with directors Martin Frič and Hugo Haas and continued to make short documentaries. His frequent collaborators were cameraman Václav Hanuš and composer Jiří Srnka. Weiss was in the middle of editing of the feature-length documentary for the 20 year anniversary of Czechoslovakia called Twenty Years of Freedom. After the Munich Agreement the film was canceled. 

In 1939, after the occupation of Czechoslovakia, he fled to England with the film material and used the footage to make a documentary The Rape of Czechoslovakia with the help of Basil Wright, Paul Rotha and Louis MacNeice. Czech diplomat Jan Masaryk acquired the funding from his English friends. Weiss volunteered for the British Army and was assigned to make war documentaries for Crown Film Unit. He also worked with the Czechoslovak Government in exile. In 1942, he wrote a book Lost Government. On March 13, 1943, Weiss and  directed a MacNeice's play A Town without a Name at Royal Albert Hall as a part of the London Calling Prague event. In 1945, he flew with No. 311 Squadron RAF. He made a documentary about them called Night and Day. At the end of the war, he joined 21st Army Group as a front cameraman to film the liberation of France, Belgium and Netherlands. Weiss was present at the liberation of Buchenwald concentration camp. His footage was later used in Alain Resnais' film Night and Fog. He achieved the rank  of captain in the British Army. Weiss refused the offer to join the US Army and become a combat cameraman in the Pacific War, because he wanted to go back to liberated Czechoslovakia.

He returned to Prague on May 13, 1945. All of his family, including his parents, were murdered in the Holocaust. He made his first full-length feature film The Stolen Frontier in 1947. Weiss, still a devoted communist at this time, turned away from politics during the communist persecutions in the early 1950s. He made his most celebrated movies in the late 1950s and 1960s, including Wolf Trap (1957), Romeo, Juliet and Darkness (1959) and Czechoslovak-British co-production Ninety Degrees in the Shade (1965).

After the Warsaw Pact invasion, Weiss left Czechoslovakia and lived in West Berlin, where he taught at a film school. Later he moved to the United States. There he taught film first at Hunter College in New York and later at UCSB. He became an American citizen in 1986. He still continued to write screenplays, but none of them were produced. During this time, he also wrote two plays – The Jewish War (1986) and Berenice (1990). In 1991, he managed to get funding and made his last film Martha and I. The film entered in competition at 47th Venice International Film Festival. In 1985, he met Alexander Payne, then a young film student, and became his life-long friend and mentor. In 1995, Weiss wrote a book of memoirs Bílý Mercedes.

Personal life
Weiss was married three times. He had two children with his first wife – a daughter Jiřina and a son Jiří. He died in Santa Monica in 2004 and is buried at New Jewish Cemetery in Prague.

Selected filmography

Feature films
 The Stolen Frontier (1947)
 Dravci (1948)
 The Last Shot (1950)
 New Warriors Will Arise (1950)
 My Friend the Gipsy (1953)
 Doggy and the Four (1954)
 Life Is at Stake (1956)
 Wolf Trap (1957)
 Appassionata (1959)
 Romeo, Juliet and Darkness (1959)
 The Coward (1961)
 Golden Fern (1963)
 Ninety Degrees in the Shade (1965)
 Murder Czech Style (1967)
 Martha and I (1991)

Documentaries
 People in the Sun (1935)
 Sun Is Shining over Lužnice (1936)
 Give us the Wings (1936)
 Sea of Air (1937)
 A Song About Carpathian Ruthenia (1937)
 The Illusion Factory (1938)
 Journey from the Shadows (1938)
 The Rape of Czechoslovakia (1939) – Lyrical documentary about pre-WWII Czechoslovakia and Nazi invasion. Narrated by Cecil Day-Lewis.
 Secret Allies  (1939)
 Eternal Prague (1940)
 Home Front (1941)
 100 Million Women (1942)
 The Other RAF (1942)
 Fighter Pilot (1943)
 Before the Raid (1943) – Docudrama about Norwegian fishermen resistance members. Written by Laurie Lee.
 Night and Day (1945) – Documentary about No. 311 Squadron RAF
 We Will Remain Faithful (1945)
 Song about Slet (1948) – Two-part documentary about Sokol XI slet festival

Awards and nominations
Venice Film Festival

Wolf Trap (1957) - 19th Venice International Film Festival
Won: FIPRESCI Award
Won: New Cinema Award
Nominated: Golden Lion

Golden Fern  (1963) - 24th Venice International Film Festival
Nominated: Golden Lion

Martha and I (1991) - 47th Venice International Film Festival
Nominated: Golden Lion

Berlin International Film Festival

Ninety Degrees in the Shade (1965) - 15th Berlin International Film Festival
Won: UNICRIT Award

San Sebastian International Film Festival

Romeo, Juliet and Darkness (1959)
Won: Golden Shell

Murder Czech Style (1967)
Won: Silver Shell

Golden Globe Awards

Ninety Degrees in the Shade (1965) - 23rd Golden Globe Awards
 Nominated: Best English-Language Foreign Film

Bibliography

References

External links

100 Million Women (1942) on Imperial War Museum website
Fighter Pilot (1943) on Imperial War Museum website
Night and Day (1945) on Imperial War Museum website
A recorded interview with Jiří weiss about his RAF films - Imperial War Museum, 1990

1913 births
2004 deaths
Czechoslovak film directors
Czech film directors
Czech screenwriters
Male screenwriters
Czech male writers
Czech documentary filmmakers
Czech dramatists and playwrights
Czech children's writers
Jewish dramatists and playwrights
Jewish Czech writers
Czech Jews
Czechoslovak Jews
Czechoslovak emigrants to the United States
Czechoslovak emigrants to Germany
Hunter College faculty
University of California, Santa Barbara faculty
20th-century screenwriters